Dan Margalit may refer to:

 Dan Margalit (journalist) (born 1938), Israeli journalist, author and television host.
 Dan Margalit (mathematician) (born 1976), American mathematician